The women's luge at the 2018 Winter Olympics was held between 12 and 13 February 2018 at the Alpensia Sliding Centre near Pyeongchang, South Korea.

Summary
The defending champion was Natalie Geisenberger; the field also included the 2014 silver medalist and the 2010 champion Tatjana Hüfner and the bronze medalist Erin Hamlin. Geizenberger posted the fastest times in two runs out of four, her competitors were less consistent, and she had no difficulties replicated her 2014 success, becoming the third luger ever won three gold Olympic medals (after her compatriots Georg Hackl and Felix Loch). Dajana Eitberger, who had the fastest last run, took silver, and Alex Gough became the bronze medalist. For Eitberger and Gough, these were their first Olympic medals, and Gough's medal became the first ever Canadian Olympic medal in luge. Tatjana Hüfner, the 2010 Olympic champion and the 2014 silver medalist, had the third time in the first run, but was only sixth in the second run, and eventually only became fourth.

Qualifying athletes

Competition schedule
All times are (UTC+9).

Results
Four runs, split over two days, will be used to determine the winner.

References

Luge at the 2018 Winter Olympics
Women's events at the 2018 Winter Olympics